Matilde André (born 11 February 1986) is an Angolan handball player. She plays on the Angola women's national handball team and participated at the 2011 World Women's Handball Championship in Brazil.

At club level, she plays for Angolan side Progresso do Sambizanga.

References

1986 births
Living people
Angolan female handball players
Handball players from Luanda
African Games gold medalists for Angola
African Games medalists in handball
Competitors at the 2011 All-Africa Games
Competitors at the 2015 African Games